Broomfield may refer to:

People
 Broomfield (surname)

Places
In New Zealand:

 Broomfield, New Zealand, Hurunui District
 Broomfield, Christchurch

In the United Kingdom:
Broomfield, Aberdeenshire
 Broomfield, Cumbria
Broomfield, Essex, a suburb of Chelmsford
Broomfield Hospital
Broomfield, Herne Bay, Kent
Broomfield, Maidstone, Kent
Broomfield, Somerset
Broomfield, Wiltshire
Broomfield House, Enfield, North London, and the surrounding Broomfield Park
Broomfield School (Arnos Grove), Enfield, North London

In the United States:
 Broomfield, Colorado
 Broomfield Township, Michigan
 Broomfield Rowhouse in Omaha, Nebraska

Sports venues
 New Broomfield, Airdrie, Scotland
 Broomfield Park, Airdrie, Scotland

See also
Bloomfield (disambiguation)
Bromfield (disambiguation)
Brumfield

ja:ブルームフィールド